Cuadrilátero  is a 1970 Spanish boxing-themed film directed by Eloy de la Iglesia and starring José María Prada, Deane Selmier and Rosana Yanny.

Cast
Dean Selmier as Miguel Valdés  
José Legra as José Laguna 
Rosanna Yanni as Elena 
José María Prada
Irene Daina as Olga 
María Luisa San José as prostitute
Pilar Cansino as Estrella

References

External links
 

1970 films
Films directed by Eloy de la Iglesia
1970s Spanish-language films
Spanish boxing films
1970s Spanish films